Werner Naumann (16 June 1909 – 25 October 1982) was a German civil servant and politician. He was State Secretary in Joseph Goebbels' Ministry of Public Enlightenment and Propaganda during the Nazi Germany era. He was appointed head of the Propaganda Ministry by Adolf Hitler in his last will and testament after Goebbels was promoted to Reichskanzler. Naumann was present in the Führerbunker in late April 1945.

Early life and political career
Naumann was born in Guhrau in Silesia, Prussia, Germany. After finishing school, he studied political economics. Naumann joined the Nazi Party in 1928. Naumann became a member of the SA where he rose to the rank of Brigadeführer by 1933. Thereafter, Naumann joined the SS. In 1937 he was Chief of the Propaganda Office in Breslau.

A year later he was made the personal aide of Joseph Goebbels and in 1942 became his assistant secretary. His official title was "Undersecretary and Chief of the Minister's Office in the Propaganda Ministry". In April 1944 Naumann was named State Secretary in the Propaganda Ministry. He was a member of the Freundeskreis Reichsführer SS around Heinrich Himmler and served in the Waffen-SS during World War II.

In the final days of Nazi Germany as Soviet forces took Berlin, he was appointed Propaganda Minister in the Flensburg government of Karl Dönitz by Hitler's Testament of 29 April 1945. On 1 May 1945, he was the leader of break-out group number 3 from the Führerbunker in Berlin. The group included Martin Bormann, Hans Baur, Ludwig Stumpfegger and Artur Axmann. Erich Kempka testified at Nuremberg that he had last seen Naumann walking a metre (a yard) in front of Bormann when a Soviet rocket exploded by Bormann while crossing the Weidendammer Bridge under heavy fire in Berlin. According to Axmann, the group followed a Tiger tank that spearheaded the first attempt to storm across the bridge, but it was destroyed. Bormann, Stumpfegger and himself were "knocked over" when the tank was hit. Axmann crawled to a shellhole where he met up again with Naumann, Bormann, Baur, and Stumpfegger; they all made it across the bridge. From that group, only Naumann and Axmann escaped from the Soviet Red Army encirclement of Berlin and made it to western Germany.

Later life and death
After Germany's defeat, Naumann lived under an assumed name for five years. He re-emerged after the 1950 amnesty and resumed his contacts within the far-right, including Hans-Ulrich Rudel, Ernst Achenbach, Artur Axmann, Otto Skorzeny and many others. They infiltrated the Free Democratic Party for a period of about two years. Naumann was arrested by the British Army on 16 January 1953 for being the leader of a Neo-Nazi group that attempted to infiltrate West German political parties; for which he was banned for life from standing for election as an "offender" under a new clause added to the constitution by Adenauer's government.  One survivor, Bernt Engelmann observed the Zwangsdemokrat ("forced democrat") was only pretending. He was released after seven months in custody. Later on, he became director at a metal firm in Lüdenscheid that was owned by Goebbels' stepson Harald Quandt.  Naumann's own book Nau Nau gefährdet das Empire? was published by Dürer Haus in 1953. Dürer became a banned agency, but maintained operations in Argentina.

Neumann died in 1982 in Lüdenscheid, West Germany, aged 73. He was buried in the Kommunal cemetery of Piepersloh, Werkhagener Strasse, in Lüdenscheid.

Notes

References

Citations

Bibliography
 
 
 
 
 
 

1909 births
1982 deaths
People from Góra
Officials of Nazi Germany
Nazi propagandists
People from the Province of Silesia
Nazi Party politicians
German neo-Nazis
Waffen-SS personnel